The JCW Tag Team Championship is a professional wrestling tag team championship in Juggalo Championship Wrestling. Twelve teams, comprising a total of twenty-five wrestlers, have held the JCW Tag Team Championship, combining for a total of twenty-two title reigns.


Title history
Key

Combined reigns

By team

By wrestler

See also
JCW Heavyweight Championship

References

External links
 Official JCW website
 JCW Tag Team Championship

Juggalo Championship Wrestling
Tag team wrestling championships